Maurice Jéhin was a French equestrian. He competed in two events at the 1900 Summer Olympics.

References

Year of birth missing
Year of death missing
French male equestrians
Olympic equestrians of France
Equestrians at the 1900 Summer Olympics
Place of birth missing
Place of death missing